Dream sharing is the process of  documenting or discussing both night and day dreams with others. One of the primary purposes of sharing dreams is dream interpretation.

The act of dream sharing is shown to increase empathy, especially for the listener. Dreams are a common denominator amongst humans of all nations and cultures. Increasing the rate of discussion regarding dreams leads to more understanding about the personality of someone otherwise difficult to connect with due to language or cultural barriers.

Currently, dream sharing is more prevalent in certain demographics. Women are found to share and discuss dreams and nightmares more frequently than men. During this discovery, dream and nightmare recall were controlled to be proportional frequencies across the two sexes, signifying that the differences in dream sharing were not due to biological dream factors such as memory, but from the stigma around men sharing personal thoughts with each other. Personality traits such as openness and extraversion were also positively correlated with dream sharing frequency.

History 

The sharing of dreams dates back at least as far as 4000-3000 BC in permanent form on clay tablets. In ancient Egypt, dreams were among the items recorded in the form of hieroglyphics. In ancient Egyptian culture dream sharing had a religious context as priests doubled as dream interpreters.

Those whose dreams were especially vivid or significant were thought to be blessed and were given special status in these ancient societies.  Likewise, people who were able to interpret dreams were thought to receive these gifts directly from the gods, and they enjoyed a special status in society as well.

The respect for dreams changed radically early in the 19th century, and dreams in that era were often dismissed as reactions to anxiety, outside noises or even bad food and indigestion. During this period of time, dreams were thought to have no meaning at all, and interest in dream interpretation all but evaporated. This all changed, however, with the arrival of Sigmund Freud later in the 19th century. Freud stunned the world of psychiatry by stressing the importance of dreams, and he revived the once dead art of dream interpretation.

Freud's interpretation 
Freud represented the view that in order to understand one's unconscious, dreams are to be dissected and discussed.

See also 
 Dream diary
 Dream interpretation

References

Further reading 

 
 
 
 
 

Sharing
Sharing